Shikar Pur , is a town of Mauza Hyderabad Thall of Mankera Tehsil, of Bhakkar District, in the Punjab province of Pakistan. It is situated about 266 kilometers west of the city of Lahore.

References

External links
 Shikar pur 
 Mankera on BigBlueBall
 Map of Mankera 
 Wasib | Ancient Riasat Mankera

Populated places in Bhakkar District